UFC 43: Meltdown was a mixed martial arts event held by the Ultimate Fighting Championship on June 6, 2003, at the Thomas and Mack Center in Las Vegas, Nevada. The event was broadcast live on pay-per-view in the United States, and later released on DVD.

History
Headlining the card was an Interim Light Heavyweight Championship match between future UFC Hall of Fame inductees Randy Couture and Chuck Liddell.

Ken Shamrock was originally slated to face Ian Freeman at this event, but was forced from the card with a torn ACL. Vernon White would step in as his replacement.

Results

See also 
 Ultimate Fighting Championship
 List of UFC champions
 List of UFC events
 2003 in UFC

References

External links
Sherdog event results
Full Contact Fighter news/June 03

Ultimate Fighting Championship events
2003 in mixed martial arts
Mixed martial arts in Las Vegas
2003 in sports in Nevada